Sad Story of Self Supporting Child (저 하늘에도 슬픔이 - Jeo haneuledo seulpeumi) aka Sorrow in the Heavens is a 1965 South Korean film directed by Kim Soo-yong. It was awarded Best Film at the Blue Dragon Film Awards ceremony. Actor Kim Yong-yeon was given a special award for his performance in the film at the Grand Bell Awards ceremony.

Synopsis
This family melodrama tells the story of Lee Yun-bok, a fourth-grader in a poor family. Unable to tolerate his father's gambling and cruelty, his mother leaves home. Yun-bok helps support the family by shining shoes, and keeps a journal. When his journal is made public in school, Yun-bok's father repents of his bad behavior, and his mother returns home.

Cast
 Shin Young-kyun
 Kim Cheon-man
 Ju Jeung-ryu
 Kim Yong-yeon
 Choe Nan-gyeong
 Hwang Jung-seun
 Kim Sin-jae
 Jo Mi-ryeong
 Jang Min-ho
 Kang Kye-shik

Bibliography

English

Korean

Notes

External links 
 
 

1965 films
Best Picture Blue Dragon Film Award winners
1960s Korean-language films
South Korean drama films
Films directed by Kim Soo-yong